Neve Tzedek Tower is a skyscraper in the city of Tel Aviv, Israel.

History

Neve Tzedek Tower is located on the border of Neve Tzedek, Tel Aviv's oldest district. It is one of the tallest residential building in Israel, at 147 meters in height, with over 44 floors. The tower contains 300 apartments and was completed in 2007. It is taller than typical apartment buildings because some of the floors have loft units with greater floor-to-ceiling heights. Each floor is approximately 850 square metres in size and contains between three and thirteen apartments. On the tenth floor of the tower there is an indoor swimming pool and a private gym. The tower was designed by Gabai Architecture & Building.

The Tower is located on 61 Eilat street, Tel Aviv.

References

External links
Neve Tzedek Tower at Emporis
Neve Tzedek Tower

Buildings and structures completed in 2007
Skyscrapers in Tel Aviv
Residential skyscrapers in Israel
2007 establishments in Israel